The Hundred of Koolywurtie is a hundred in the County of Fergusson in South Australia. 

Its name is thought to be derived from the place known as "Koolywurtie or Black Point." The first local government body within the hundred was the District Council of Minlaton.

The localities of Koolywurtie, Port Rickaby and Bluff Beach, and the northern end of the locality of Maitland are within the hundred.

References

Koolywurtie
Koolywurtie
1874 establishments in Australia